Jaroslav Cardal (16 March 1919 in Mrklov – 6 May 2010 in Jilemnice) was a Czechoslovakian cross-country skier who competed in the late 1940s and early 1950s. Competing in three Winter Olympics, he finished eighth in the 50 km event in 1948 and 14th in the 50 km event in 1952.

References

External links
Olympic 50 km cross country skiing results: 1948-64
Article on Jaroslav Cardal's 90th birthday 
Jaroslav Cardal's obituary 

1919 births
2010 deaths
Czech male cross-country skiers
Czechoslovak male cross-country skiers
People from Semily District
Olympic cross-country skiers of Czechoslovakia
Cross-country skiers at the 1948 Winter Olympics
Cross-country skiers at the 1952 Winter Olympics
Cross-country skiers at the 1956 Winter Olympics
Sportspeople from the Liberec Region